Giuliano Giampiccoli (1698 - 10 December 1759) was an Italian engraver of vedute and architectural renderings.

Biography
He was born in Belluno, son of Girolamo Giampiccoli (also sometimes written as Gianpiccoli, Iampicoli, Zampicoli, and Gampiccoli) and Livia Ricci, the sister of the painter Marco Ricci. His brother Marco Sebastiano (1706-1782) was also an engraver.

He collaborated with a young Giovanni Battista Tiepolo in a series of etchings of classical ruins for the British Consul Joseph Smith. He also participated in a volume of engravings of villas in Tuscany after designs of Giuseppe Zocchi, with other collaborators including Giuseppe Benedetti, Filippo Morghen, Pietro Monaco, Joseph Wagner, Marcantonio Corsi, Giuseppe Filosi, Niccolo Mogalli, Philothee-François Duflos, Michele Marieschi, Vincenzo Franceschini, Johann Sebastien Müller, and Giovanni Battista Piranesi.

References

1698 births
1759 deaths
People from Belluno
Italian engravers
18th-century Italian painters
Italian male painters
18th-century Italian male artists